The 1954 New York Giants season was the franchise's 72nd season. The Giants won the National League pennant with a record of 97 wins and 57 losses and then defeated the Cleveland Indians in four games in the World Series.  It was the team's final World Series championship until 2010.

Offseason
 October 8, 1953: Chuck Diering, Frank Hiller, Adrián Zabala and $60,000 were traded by the Giants to the San Francisco Seals for Windy McCall.
 December 1, 1953: 1953 minor league draft
Lee Tate was drafted by the Giants from the Philadelphia Phillies.
John Anderson was drafted by the Giants from the Philadelphia Phillies.
 February 2, 1954: Joey Amalfitano was signed as an amateur free agent (bonus baby) by the Giants.
 Prior to 1954 season (exact date unknown)
John Anderson was returned by the Giants to the Phillies.
Ramón Conde was signed as an amateur free agent by the Giants.

Regular season
September 22, 1954: In a game against the New York Giants, Karl Spooner of the Brooklyn Dodgers struck out 15 batters in his very first game, setting a Major League record.

Season standings

Record vs. opponents

Opening Day lineup

Notable transactions
 April 13, 1954: Tony Taylor was signed as an amateur free agent by the Giants.
 September 8, 1954: Joe Garagiola was selected off waivers by the Giants from the Chicago Cubs.

Roster

Player stats

Batting

Starters by position
Note: Pos = Position; G = Games played; AB = At bats; H = Hits; Avg. = Batting average; HR = Home runs; RBI = Runs batted in

Other batters
Note: G = Games played; AB = At bats; H = Hits; Avg. = Batting average; HR = Home runs; RBI = Runs batted in

Pitching

Starting pitchers
Note: G = Games pitched; IP = Innings pitched; W = Wins; L = Losses; ERA = Earned run average; SO = Strikeouts

Other pitchers
Note: G = Games pitched; IP = Innings pitched; W = Wins; L = Losses; ERA = Earned run average; SO = Strikeouts

Relief pitchers
Note: G = Games pitched; W = Wins; L = Losses; SV = Saves; ERA = Earned run average; SO = Strikeouts

1954 World Series 

The New York Giants swept the Cleveland Indians in what would be their final World Series win in New York.

It was the first time the Cleveland Indians had been swept in a World Series. The only highlight for the Indians was that they kept the Yankees from winning their sixth straight series. The last time the Yankees had not won the series or pennant beforehand was 1948, when, again, the Indians kept them out (although that year, they won the Series).

Game 1
September 29, 1954, at the Polo Grounds in New York City

Game 2
September 30, 1954, at the Polo Grounds in New York City

Game 3
October 1, 1954, at Cleveland Stadium in Cleveland, Ohio

Game 4
October 2, 1954, at Cleveland Stadium in Cleveland, Ohio

Awards and honors
 Willie Mays, Associated Press Athlete of the Year

Farm system

LEAGUE CHAMPIONS: Danville (M-OV)

Tar Heel League disbanded, June 21, 1954

Notes

References
 1954 New York Giants team at Baseball-Reference
 1954 New York Giants team at Baseball Almanac

New York Giants (NL)
San Francisco Giants seasons
New York Giants season
National League champion seasons
World Series champion seasons
1954 in sports in New York City
1950s in Manhattan
Washington Heights, Manhattan